Charley Phil Rosenberg (Charles Green; August 15, 1902 – March 12, 1976) was an American boxer. He was the World Bantamweight Champion from 1925 to 1927. His trainers were the legendary Ray Arcel, and Whitey Bimstein, and his manager was Harry Segal.

Early life
Charlie Rosenberg was born in New York City's Lower East Side on August 15, 1902, as Charles Green. He came from a large family of nine siblings. Before he was born, his father died in an accident while working as a laborer at a clothing factory. His widowed mother Rachel, struggling to provide for the family, was forced to place three of his siblings in a Hebrew Orphan Asylum. When Charley was only five, his mother decided to move the family from the Lower East Side to Harlem, a more ethnically mixed section that still contained many Jews. Charley grew up poor and struggling in a neighborhood where children from different races and religions often competed in the streets to get by.  Rosenberg was working as an errand boy for a millinery shop when co-worker Phil Rosenberg had to pull out of a scheduled match.

He won his bout substituting for Phil Rosenberg, and subsequently took his name as his ring moniker. He retained his real first name of Charlie.

Early boxing career
Rosenberg began fighting as a bantamweight in 1921, and lost most of his fights through May 1922.

Charlie's manager Harry Segal, frustrated with Charlie's poor record in his early fights, may have intentionally overmatched him with Olympic Flyweight Champion Frankie Genaro around that time. Although losing the twelve round points decision at the Commonwealth Sporting Club against Genaro on May 23, 1922, the close fight could have gone either way, and Charlie's manager was impressed with his young boxer's ability to learn. Rosenberg had picked up pointers on bobbing, ducking, and effectively using his left, from Jewish boxing great Benny Valgar, while training at his gym.  He would meet Genaro again on October 21, 1922, in another close twelve round bout. Rosenberg would become known for his speed, hard hitting ability, and cleverness in the ring.

After his first bout with Genaro, Rosenberg defeated important prospects Sammy Butts and Henry Catena.  He won a twelve round decision against the up and coming local bantamweight Butts in a semi-final bout at New York's Commonwealth Sporting Club on July 8, 1922.   On October 30, 1923, he defeated the prolific Black boxer Danny Edwards, in a ten round points decision at New York's Pioneer Sporting Club.  Edwards would fight top talent in his long career, including several champions, but he had a three inch height disadvantage against Rosenberg.  The talented Black boxer had a lead in the first five rounds, but Rosenberg performed well enough in the final five to take the decision.  In the sixth, Rosenberg battered Edwards with both hands to the face and body and nearly staggered him at the round's end with a right.  Edwards showed experience and ring generalship to complete the final four rounds still on his feet as he tired.

He defeated Harry London on November 22, 1923, in a twelve round points decision at the Commonwealth Sporting Club at 120 pounds.  He then lost to talented future Bantamweight Champion Bud Taylor on October 19, 1923, in Madison Square Garden.  In their twelve round October decision, Rosenberg finished strong in the last two rounds when he caught Taylor with solid right hooks to the chin, though Taylor connected often, with a solid blow in the last round, and clearly won the first two rounds. Many in the crowd were disappointed in the ruling for Taylor, though he may have lost his advantage from an injured right hand in the fifth.

Bouts with Eddie Martin, 1923–24 
Rosenberg and "Cannonball" Eddie Martin, 1925 Bantamweight Champion of the World, met three times, twice in six round decisions and once in a draw. On November 29, 1923, and January 28, 1924, Martin defeated Rosenberg, in close decisions on points, both times in New York's Madison Square Garden. In their third meeting, a fast and furious affair on April 29, 1924, Rosenberg gave Martin a closer battle which ended in a ten round draw.   Martin seemed to take the first four rounds, but in the next four Rosenberg slipped many of Martin's blows, and raked his opponent with well placed left jabs that may have dazed Martin at times.  The match was again at Madison Square Garden and enthralled the 8,000 fans.

Rosenberg defeated Irish boxer Johnny Curtin, one of his top bantamweight competitors, on October 10, 1924, in an important ten round points decision before a crowd at Madison Square Garden.  In his career, Curtin would box most of the great bantamweights of his era.

Rosenberg won a ten round decision from Black boxer Wilbur Cohen on November 15, 1924, in New York.  Cohen fought the best fighters of his generation, including many champions, but their fight at Harlem's Commonwealth Sporting Club, brought limited publicity, likely because it was an early interracial bout.

Bantamweight champion
Charlie won nine fights in a row in 1924, three by knockouts, and earned a title shot. He defeated Eddie Martin on March 20, 1925, to win the world bantamweight crown. The bout was a fifteen round unanimous decision that took place in Madison Square Garden.  Ray Arcel, his skilled handler, had prepared him well for the bout, and though Rosenberg had lost thirty-seven pounds in only two months of training, many ringside believed he gained momentum and strength in the final rounds.  In the sweeping victory, the Lincoln Evening Journal wrote "Rosenberg had a clean margin in eleven of the fifteen rounds, and three were even." Martin appeared to have held a slight lead only in the early rounds. The Palm Beach Post noted that Rosenberg won using a "tantalizing left jab and a right uppercut, outboxing Martin at every turn and at the latter part of the match, holding his own in a furious toe-to-toe skirmish." Rosenberg had had trouble making weight for the bout, and needed to lose twenty pounds during his training. According to his trainer Ray Arcell, this had been a difficult process, though a successful one.

Rosenberg was described by Time magazine as: wan as if he had spent his life loitering with La Belle Dame Sans Merci beside her autumnal lake, her birdless woods; his face was drawn, his body lean almost to emaciation.  He was a young Jew, the challenger....  For 13 rounds, the sturdy champion took a dreadful drubbing.... At the end of the 15th round, the referee lifted the hand of the challenger, Charley ("Phil") Rosenberg, thus giving him the title of the champion.

Bantam title defense, 1925
His most important title defense was against Eddie Shea on July 23, 1925, at New York's Velodrome. Rosenberg retained the New York Athletic Commission's World Bantamweight Title in a fourth round TKO.  Shea had the advantage until the third round, when Rosenberg began pounding Shea with blows to the midsection. In the fourth, Rosenberg floored Shea with a straight right, but somehow Shea managed to rise.  Rosenberg then followed with a feinted left followed by a hard right which ended the fight.  The blows looked authentic ringside, but the boxing commissioner Jim Farley considered the bout "suspicious" and banned both boxers from fighting in New York for life, though Rosenberg's ban was later lifted.  Vast betting on the bout was one of the reasons for the suspicions of the commissioner.

On May 21, 1926, Rosenberg defeated the reigning Canadian Bantamweight champion Bobby Eber in Toronto, Canada in a non-title 5th round knockout.  Rosenberg was four pounds above the 118 pound weight limit, and would often have trouble making weight.   Rosenberg floored the Canadian shortly after Eber had prevented his corner from ending the bout.

Fighting slightly over the top of bantamweight range, Rosenberg easily defeated former World bantamweight contender Benny Schwartz on January 3, 1927, in a twelve round decision in Baltimore.  At least one local paper felt Schwartz had fought well against the reigning champion and noted that Rosenberg was well over the bantamweight range and would have a difficult time against Bushy Graham.

Loss of Bantam Title, 1927
Rosenberg lost the World Bantamweight Title to Bushy Graham on February 4, 1927, in a fifteen round decision at Madison Square Garden. He was only a slight favorite in early betting. Though he won the fight, he forfeited the title because he had exceeded the weight restriction for bantams by around 4 pounds. Both boxers and managers were punished for a secret agreement regarding whether they intended to make weight and how they would split the winnings. Rosenberg's manager Harry Segal, had his license revoked in New York.  Rosenberg denied he had a secret arrangement with Graham, but both were suspended for a year.

Rosenberg won a few more matches fighting as a featherweight before his retirement in January 1929.  His wins included opponents Harry Scott, Georgie Mack, and the ex-champion Johnny Dundee.  In his close ten round win by decision over Dundee on January 4, 1929, before 13,000 in Madison Square Garden, Rosenberg was down from a stiff right to the face in the fifth, though Dundee's two falls to the mat in the fourth and eighth may have been slips.  Rosenberg fought at 132, and complained of fatigue at the end of the bout, though he fought several rounds delivering stinging rights to Dundee's jaw, and gave a flurry of blows to the older Dundee in the last ten seconds of most rounds.  It was a close bout, and several ringside felt the combatants, who were certainly not the feature bout, were well past their prime.

Life after boxing
In the early 1930s, Rosenberg served a jail term as a result of racketeering in the poultry industry in the Bronx.

In the late 1930s, Charley became an insurance salesman and stayed in the field for the next thirty years.  In his later years, he managed several restaurants.  Rosenberg died on March 12, 1976, at Jewish Memorial Hospital in New York City.  He was survived by wife Elsie, a brother and two sisters.

Rosenberg's professional record in 65 bouts: won 33 (7 KOs), drew 8, lost 17, 7 no-decisions.

Professional boxing record
All information in this section is derived from BoxRec, unless otherwise stated.

Official record

All newspaper decisions are officially regarded as “no decision” bouts and are not counted as a win, loss or draw.

Unofficial record

Record with the inclusion of newspaper decisions to the win/loss/draw column.

Hall of Fame
Rosenberg was inducted into the International Jewish Sports Hall of Fame in 1990.

See also
List of bantamweight boxing champions
List of select Jewish boxers

References

External links
Jewish Sports bio

Charlie Phil Rosenberg - CBZ Profile

|-

 

Boxers from New York City
Jewish American boxers
Jewish boxers
Bantamweight boxers
World boxing champions
World bantamweight boxing champions
1902 births
1976 deaths
American male boxers
20th-century American Jews